Tilloclytus nivicinctus is a species of longhorn beetle in the Cerambycinae subfamily. It was described by Chevrolat in 1862. It is known from Cuba.

References

Anaglyptini
Beetles described in 1862
Endemic fauna of Cuba